Adam Khan is a British sportsman.

Adam Khan may also refer to:

 Adam Khan (Constitutional Loya Jirga) a delegate to Afghanistan's Constitutional Loya Jirga
Adam Khan and Durkhanai

See also
De Adam Khan, Afghanistan
Adham Khan, general